The German Sociological Association (Deutsche Gesellschaft für Soziologie, DGS) is a professional organization of social scientists in Germany. Established in Berlin on January 3, 1909,  its founding members included Rudolf Goldscheid, Ferdinand Tönnies, Max Weber, and Georg Simmel. Its first president was Tönnies, who was forced out of office by the Nazi regime in 1933; his successor, Hans Freyer, attempted to reform the DGS on Nazi lines but ultimately decided to suspend its activities the following year. The DGS was revived after World War II under the chairmanship of Leopold von Wiese in 1946, and has remained active since then, with about 3,200 members .

Presidents and chairpersons
The following members have served as heads of the organization:
1909–1933: Ferdinand Tönnies as president
1933: Werner Sombart, Leopold von Wiese, and Hans Freyer unconstitutionally as joint chairs
1933–1934: Hans Freyer as chair; suspended the DGS in 1934
1946–1955: Leopold von Wiese; office titled president
1955–1959: Helmuth Plessner
1959–1963: Otto Stammer
1963–1967: Theodor W. Adorno
1967–1970: Ralf Dahrendorf; office titled chair
1970: Erwin K. Scheuch (interim chair)
1971–1974: M. Rainer Lepsius 
1974–1978: Karl Martin Bolte
1979–1982: Joachim Matthes
1983–1986: Burkart Lutz
1987–1990: Wolfgang Zapf
1991–1992: Bernhard Schäfers
1993–1994: Lars Clausen
1995–1998: Stefan Hradil
1999–2002: Jutta Allmendinger
2003–2007: Karl-Siegbert Rehberg
2007–2011: Hans-Georg Soeffner
2011–2013: Martina Löw
2013–2017: Stephan Lessenich
2017–2019: Nicole Burzan
2019–2021: Birgit Blättel-Mink
2021–present: Paula-Irene Villa Braslavsky

References

External links 
 DGS - Deutsche Gesellschaft für Soziologie (in German; cf. the history in: Geschichte)
 33rd Congress of the DGS, The Nature of Society, “Die Natur der Gesellschaft“), 2006

Sociological organizations
1909 establishments in Germany